Willsboro Point is a census-designated place (CDP) that occupies a peninsula of the same name in Lake Champlain in the United States. The community is in the town of Willsboro in Essex County, New York. It was first listed as a CDP prior to the 2020 census.

The peninsula is in northeastern Essex County, in the northeastern section of Willsboro, and it extends northward  into Lake Champlain, with the main body of the lake to the east and Willsboro Bay to the west. The hamlet of Willsboro Point is on the eastern shore of the peninsula, closer to the southern end.

Demographics

References 

Census-designated places in Essex County, New York
Census-designated places in New York (state)